Dana Mall is an early shopping mall in the Seef District of Manama, the capital city of Bahrain. The exterior of the mall is in Jordanian stone and the interior includes domes and stained glass ceilings.

Dana Mall is one of the first established in Bahrain, opened in 2002. It includes a food court, Lulu Hypermarket as the anchor store (the first LuLu store in Bahrain, opened in 2007, expanded in 2020), and restaurants. Dana Mall is the location of the LuLu Group head office in Bahrain.

The complex also includes the Dana Cinema, with 12 screens. The cinema has stadium seating with 2,200 seats and is considered the best in Bahrain.

The mall has been the location of ceremonies and events, for example, for World Sight Day. 
In 2021, the mall was the location of a Brave Combat Federation mixed martial arts workout and conference. Also in 2021, Jameel Al Humaidan, the Bahrain Minister of Labour and Social Development, participated in a ceremony at the mall.

See also
 List of shopping malls in Bahrain

References

External links
 Dana Mall website
 Dana Cimema website

2002 establishments in Bahrain
Shopping malls established in 2002
Shopping malls in Manama
Cinemas and movie theaters